Artem Favorov (born 19 March 1994) is a Ukrainian professional footballer who plays as a striker for Puskás Akadémia.

Career
Favorov is a product of the Dynamo Kyiv youth academy.

FC Obolon-Brovar Kyiv 
From 2013 to 2016 he played for Obolon-Brovar Kyiv in the Ukrainian First League.

Vejle Boldklub 
In 2017 he moved to Danish club Vejle Boldklub. He scored against Næstved Boldklub and won the 2017–18 Danish 1st Division with the club.

FC Desna Chernihiv 
In 2018 he signed a contract with FC Desna Chernihiv in the Ukrainian Premier League, where he played with his older brother Denys Favorov. With FC Desna Chernihiv got the Round of 16 of the 2018–19 Ukrainian Cup. He played 57 matches and scored 14 goals.

Puskás Akadémia FC 
In 2020, Favorov signed a 2.5 years contract with Puskás Akadémia in the Nemzeti Bajnokság I, the top flight of the Hungarian football system. He scored his first goal on 8 February against Paksi FC. In all, he made 10 appearances, helping the club qualify for the 2020–21 Europa League first qualifying round.

Loan to Zalaegerszeg 
In summer 2020 he went on loan to Zalaegerszeg in the Nemzeti Bajnokság I for 1 year. In the 2020–21 Nemzeti Bajnokság I season, he scored his first goal in a 3–0 away victory over MTK Budapest. On 23 December he scored his second goal against Újpest FC. On 31 January 2021, he scored his third goal of the season against Paksi FC. On 24 April he scored against his parent club Puskás Akadémia.

Puskás Akadémia FC 
In June 2021 he returned to Puskás Akadémia. On 8 June and 15 June he played against Inter Turku in the 2021–22 UEFA Europa Conference League. On 27 June he played for the second qualifying round of the UEFA Conference League against RFS. On 1 August he played his first match of the 2021-22 Nemzeti Bajnokság I against Újpest. On 18 August he scored his first goal of season his former team Zalaegerszeg.

International career
He was called up to the Ukraine's under-23 squad for the Commonwealth of Independent States Cup in January 2014 but was not included in the final squad list.

Personal life
His older brother Denys Favorov is also a professional football player.

Outside of professional football
In March 2022, during the Siege of Chernihiv, Artem with his brother Denys Favorov and others players raised money for the defense of the city of Chernihiv.

Career statistics

Club

Honours
Desna Chernihiv
Ukrainian First League: 2017–18

Obolon-Brovar Kyiv
 Ukrainian Second League: 2014–15

Individual
Top Scorer of Ukrainian First League: 2015-16  (11 goals),
Top Scorer of Zalaegerszegi: season 2020–21  (7 goals),
Best Player of Ukrainian First League: 2015-16
Best Player of Zalaegerszegi in 2020-21
Top Scorer of Puskás Akadémia: runner-up 2021-22  (6 goals),

References

External links
 Profile from Official site of Puskás Akadémia
 
 
 

Ukrainian footballers
FC Obolon-Brovar Kyiv players
Association football forwards
1994 births
Living people
Footballers from Kyiv
FC Dynamo-2 Kyiv players
FC Chornomorets-2 Odesa players
FC Zirka Kropyvnytskyi players
FC Desna Chernihiv players
Ukrainian Premier League players
Ukrainian First League players
Ukrainian Second League players
Vejle Boldklub players
Danish 1st Division players
Ukrainian expatriate footballers
Expatriate men's footballers in Denmark
Ukrainian expatriate sportspeople in Denmark
Puskás Akadémia FC players
Zalaegerszegi TE players
Nemzeti Bajnokság I players
Expatriate footballers in Hungary
Ukrainian expatriate sportspeople in Hungary
Ukraine youth international footballers
Ukraine under-21 international footballers